Nelipivka is an urban-type settlement in the Bakhmut Raion, Donetsk Oblast (province) of eastern Ukraine. Population:

Demographics
Native language as of the Ukrainian Census of 2001:
 Ukrainian 81.99%
 Russian 17.16%
 Belarusian 0.70%

References

Urban-type settlements in Bakhmut Raion